Košice International Airport  is an international airport serving Košice, Slovakia. It is the second largest international airport in Slovakia. It serves both scheduled and charter, domestic and international flights. Airport capacity is 800,000 passengers a year as of 2012.

Košice Airport operates 7 direct flights to the following destinations - Prague (Ryanair), Warsaw - Fryderyk Chopin Airport (LOT Polish Airlines), Vienna (Austrian Airlines), London - to London Luton Airport (Wizz Air ) and London-Stansted Airport (Ryanair), Liverpool (Ryanair) and Dublin (Ryanair). More than 300 destinations are available with a maximum of one change.

History 
Construction of the airport began in 1950s near the suburb of Barca. In 1954, construction began on the first part of the new passenger terminal, hangar and new control tower. In 1955, direct flights began between Košice and Prague. The power supply was enhanced by more powerful transformers in 1962. Increasing traffic required a larger passenger terminal by the mid 1960s. The foundation of the SNP Air Force Academy in 1973 strengthened aviation in the then republic of Czechoslovakia. Military aviation at the airport stopped in 2004.

Another extensive reconstruction of the runways and equipment area took place in 1992-1993. In 2001, the construction of a new terminal began, which was opened in 2004 and in 2005 was awarded the title Construction of the Year 2005. In 2004, the business company Letisko Košice - Airport Kosice, a.s. was established, in which a strategic partner joined in 2006. In 2007, the handling area was expanded, which increased the number of stands.

After the completion of the new terminal, the airport was privatized; currently the largest share (66%) of business in the airport is KSC Holding, a. s., whose majority shareholder is Vienna-Schwechat Airport, and the remaining share (34%) is owned by the Slovak Republic.

Airport charges 
Košice Airport has charges comparable to nearby airports in Vienna, Prague and Budapest. The airport is trying to attract new carriers and fly out new routes from Košice. Carriers who want to introduce new lines are designated Growth Incentive Scheme, which reduces their fees.

Terminals 
Facilities include international and domestic departure and domestic gates, aviation and travel agencies, a nursery, a quiet room, and comfortable business lounge. There are also restaurants, car rental booths and small shops.

Airlines and destinations

The following airlines operate scheduled services to and from Košice Airport:

Statistics

Routes to and from Košice Airport (2022)

Ground Transport 

Bus 
Bus 23 is operated by the local public transport company. It connects the airport and the station square, where you can find a bus and train station. The bus route passes through the city center and it takes about 20 minutes.

Taxi 
The official partner of the airport is AIRTAXI which provides 24-hour service and has fully air-conditioned premium Škoda Superb vehicles. The price of transport from the airport to the city center is 18 €. AirTaxi dispatching will arrange a vehicle for you on the exact date and time or for your arrival. The driver will be waiting for you with a name tag in the arrival hall.

Car 
The airport lies directly adjacent to the highway which leads to the ring road. Passengers driving their own cars can park at the airport parking lots. You have a choice of 3 parking lots: short-term parking P1, long-term parking P2, long-term parking P3 for parking during longer journeys, the minimum parking time there is 8 hours. Your car will be monitored by a camera system throughout the parking period.  Car rental facilities are also available at the airport.

References

External links
 Košice International Airport (official site)
 

Buildings and structures in Košice
A
Airports in Slovakia
20th-century architecture in Slovakia